At the 1908 Summer Olympics in London, six swimming events were contested. These were the first Olympic Games in which a 100-metre pool had been especially constructed (inside the main stadium's track and field oval). Previous Olympic events were swum in open water (1896: The Mediterranean Sea, 1900: The Seine River, 1904: an artificial lake). Only men participated in the swimming events. The competitions were held from Monday, July 13, 1908, to Saturday, July 25, 1908.

All six of the 1908 events became staples of the Olympic swimming programme, and have been contested at every edition of the Games since.  The 50 m, 200 m, and 800 m freestyle events were dropped from the previous edition (though the 50 m and 200 m would later return), the relay was lengthened from 4×50 yards to 4×200 m, and the 400 m breaststroke was shortened to 200 metres.

Canada and Finland made their first appearances in swimming, while Austria, Hungary, and the United States continued their streaks of appearing each time.  Fourteen nations competed in all, with 100 swimmers entering the events.

Medal table

Medal summary

Participating nations
A total of 100 swimmers from 14 nations competed at the London Games:

References

 
 
 

 
1908 Summer Olympics events
1908
1908 in swimming
Swimming competitions in the United Kingdom